Ina Lucia Hildebrand (born 1 September 1971), known professionally as Luci van Org, is a German musician, writer and actress. She is best known as the singer of the group Lucilectric, whose song "Mädchen" was a hit in Germany in 1994. Since then, she has written music for other artists and her own projects Das Haus von Luci, Üebermutter, Meystersinger and Lucina Soteira, which span over multiple genres. She has written and acted in films and television series and is the author of several novels inspired by Germanic mythology.

Early life
Ina Lucia Korch was born in Berlin's Tempelhof district on 1 September 1971. Her parents were the sculptor and graphic artist  and the painter Katharina Korch. She grew up listening to punk, industrial and gothic music and founded her first band when she was 13. At the age of 15 she played in a new wave punk band.

Music career
Korch's first contact with the music industry happened when she was 15 and Anke Wendland, a former backing vocalist for Falco, heard her at an open mic performance and hired her as backing singer for Wendland's debut solo album. Shortly after her 16th birthday, Korch signed a contract with Hansa Musik Produktion and began to release disco house under the stage name Eena. Under this name, she released the singles "18 – so what!" and "Gates of Eden". The latter was used in the film Go Trabi Go (1991). In retrospect, she regretted not having opposed the genre the company chose for her.

Lucilectric had a mainstream hit with the song "Mädchen", which was released in 1993 and reached second place in the German single chart in 1994. With its playful theme of independence and sexuality, it became an anthem for Germany's  movement, which has been compared to the girly girl, girl power and riot grrrl concepts of the English-speaking world. It has remained what Org is best known for. Another Lucilectric song, "Hey Süßer", also charted in 1994, and the same year the band released its debut album Mädchen. Lucilectric released two more albums—Süß und Gemein (1996) and Tiefer (1997)—before disbanding in 1999. Org said the first album turned out the way the members wanted, but the following albums were "catastrophic" due to compromises, which made her regard artistic freedom as something sacred for her future projects.

Her next band, Das Haus von Luci, had its basis in pop music but moved between genres, labelling itself a "Latin–disco–pop–country crossover". It released two albums, Der verbotene Raum (2003) and Der Tod wohnt nebenan (2006).

In 2006, Org formed the Neue Deutsche Härte band Üebermutter which released its debut album Unheil! through Roadrunner Records in 2008. Üebermutter is characterised by a satirical use of militaristic and totalitarian aesthetics. It was described by Die Tageszeitung as a "fetish metal project" with "feminist-agitational lyrics".

It has released three albums: Trost (2012), Haifischweide (2014) and Frieden (2017). In 2020 she launched the solo project Lucina Soteira. Org is featured on 's 2022 single "Mädchen, Mädchen", which references Lucilectric's "Mädchen".

Other works

For several years, Org had her own radio programmes on the Rundfunk Berlin-Brandenburg station . She has acted in German films and television series, including the 2002 drama film Führer Ex.

Org has been a columnist for the Berliner Morgenpost. She debuted as a fiction writer with a short story in the 2002 anthology Taxigeschichten and published her ghost story collection Der Tod wohnt nebenan in 2006, together with Das Haus von Luci's album of the same name. She wrote the play Die 7 Todsünden oder die Hochzeit der Wetterfee which premiered at Berlin's  in 2006. She has written several novels inspired by folklore and stories about Germanic gods. These include the horror story Frau Hölle from 2013 and the comedic and feminist Vagina dentata from 2019. Her 2015 novel Schneewittchen und die Kunst des Tötens is about BDSM, something she has been involved in "on and off". With this book, she wanted to change the public image of the sex-fetish scene created by works such as Fifty Shades of Grey, which she says portrays abuse and mentally broken people rather than "real BDSM".

Personal life
Org married the filmmaker  in 2001. The wedding was held in a fetish club. They live in Berlin and have one son. Her legal name is Ina Lucia Hildebrand. She describes herself as bisexual and supports a form of feminism where all tasks should be split evenly between men and women. She became a pagan in 2006 and is responsible for the Berlin South-West section of the Germanic neopagan organisation Eldaring.

Selected discography

Selected filmography

Selected bibliography

References

External links
 Personal website via Internet Archive 
 Agency page
 
 

1971 births
20th-century German actresses
20th-century German women singers
21st-century German actresses
21st-century German novelists
21st-century German screenwriters
21st-century German women singers
Actresses from Berlin
Adherents of Germanic neopaganism
Feminist musicians
Feminist writers
Film people from Berlin
German feminists
German heavy metal singers
German horror writers
German modern pagans
German television writers
German women novelists
German women pop singers
German women screenwriters
Living people
Modern pagan novelists
People from Tempelhof
Performers of modern pagan music
Singers from Berlin
Women heavy metal singers
Women horror writers
Women soap opera writers
Writers from Berlin